Isleta is a Tanoan pueblo in New Mexico.

Isleta may also refer to:

Places

New Mexico
 Isleta Village Proper, a census-designed place near the pueblo
 Isleta station, a railroad station
 Isleta Diversion Dam on the Rio Grande
 Isleta Amphitheater

Elsewhere
 Isleta, Ohio, an unincorporated community
 La Isleta Lighthouse, Canary Islands

See also
 Ysleta, Texas, a community in El Paso, Texas
 Ysleta del Sur Pueblo, a Tanoan pueblo in Texas